Sornabad may refer to:
 Sornabad, Kermanshah
 Sornabad Rural District, in Fars Province